The 1911–12 international cricket season was from September 1911 to April 1912. The season consists with single international tour.

Season overview

December

England in Australia

References

International cricket competitions by season
1911 in cricket
1912 in cricket